Float4 is a Montreal-based multidisciplinary studio that integrates digital experiences in physical spaces to amplify their identity. Founded in 2008, Float4 produces immersive and interactive installations internationally for companies. Float4 launched its proprietary platform, RealMotion, during Infocomm 2017 in Orlando.

Team 
Co-founded in 2008 by Alexandre Simionescu and Sevan Dalkian, Float4's team is diversified: multimedia designers, creative directors, producers, developers, technicians and integrators. In 2018, Float4 welcomed Alexandre Simionescu as the studio's Principal.

Projects and collaborations 
2018 - Statue of Liberty Museum in collaboration with ESI Design, Ellis Island, USA
2018 - 900 North Michigan Shops in collaboration with ESI Design, Chicago, USA
2017 - Vancouver International Airport, Vancouver, CA
2017 - Place du Canada, Montreal, CA
2017 - Casino Seneca Buffalo Creek, Buffalo, USA
2017 - Sofitel Paris Baltimore, Paris, France
2016 - Meraas City Walk, Dubaï, UAE
 2016 - eBay Main Street in collaboration with ESI Design, San Jose, California
 2016 - Royal Caribbean in collaboration with Material & Methods, Ovation of the Sea Cruise Ship
2015 - Liberty Lights, Cincinnati Ohio
 2014 - Desjardins Corporate Headquarters, Montreal QC 
 2014 - Ministère de la culture, Quebec Government
 2014 - NBA All-Star jam session, New Orleans Louisiana 
2014 - SECU Interactive Art Wall, Raleigh NC
 2014 - Mere Hotel Welcome Wall, Winnipeg
2014 - Morguard Performance Court, Ottawa ON 
 2013 - Capco Headquarters, New York City 
 2013 - ADC's 92nd Annual Awards, Miami beach
2013 - SXSW, Austin TX
 2012 - Palais des congrès Interactive Wall, Montreal QC
 2012 - Digi-key Interactive floor, Munich  
 2012 - Marine Magnet Science Highschool, Groton USA
 2012 - Saudi Aramco Headquarters, Houston  
 2012 - Canada House at the London Olympics, London
 2012 - FishNet Security Interactive Wall, Kansas City  
 2012 - Antron Showroom @Neocon, Chicago  
 2012 - One Drop's "Aqua" Exhibit  
 2012 - Davos World Economic Forum, Switzerland  
 2011 - Hotel Gansevoort Projection Mapping, New York City
 2011 - Saint Luke's Hospital of Kansas City Media Wall, Kansas City
 2011 - J.P Morgan Headquarters, New York City
 2011 - APEC Summit, Honolulu  
 2011 - Novartis Interactive Wall, Stockholm  
 2011 - Garnier Luminato, Toronto ON 
 2011 - Tryst Night Club Projection Mapping, Las Vegas  
 2011 - Flash:Light NY, New York City  
 2011 - Wisconsin Institutes for Discovery, Madison Wisconsin  
 2010 - Kyocera Campaign, Chicago
 2010 - Miami Dolphins Interactive Wall, Miami
 2010 - Verizon Executive Business Center, New Jersey

Awards and distinctions 
 2018 - HOW International Design Awards - Best of Show - City Walk Dubai 
 2018 - World Retail Awards Finalist - City Walk Dubai 
 2017 - DSE Apex Award Finalist - City Walk Dubai 
 2017 - Architizer A+Awards Finalist - Shopping Centre - City Walk Dubai 
 2017 - AV Awards Finalist - CityWalk Dubai 
 2017 - NUMIX Finalist - Immersive Production - City Walk Dubai 
 2017 - NUMIX Finalist - Branding - Sofitel Hotel 
 2017 - HOW International Design Awards - Merit Award - Sofitel Hotel 
 2017 - Horizon Interactive Award - Best in Category & Gold Winner - City Walk Dubai 
 2017 - AV Awards - Best Corporate Project of the Year Winner - eBay Main Street 
 2016 - Spark Experience Award Finalist - eBay MainStreet 
 2015 - Banque Nationale SME Award for Businesses under $5M - FLOAT4 
 2015 - Horizon Interactive Awards - Gold Winner - Liberty Lights 
 2015 - Horizon Interactive Award - Gold Winner - Royal Caribbean 
 2015 - Horizon Interactive Award - Gold Winner - NBA Digital Jam Session 
 2013 - DSE Apex Awards - Gold for Corporate Digital Media Content - SECU 
 2013 - DSA Industry Excellence Award - Aramco Experience 
 2012 - DSE Gold Apex Award - Best Event Venue - Antron Showroom 
 2011 - IIDA Design Excellence Award - Best Non-Profit Agency Deployment Self-Service Kiosk - Wisconsin Institute for Discovery  
 2011 - DSA Industry Excellence Award - Best Non-Profit Agency Deployment Self-Service Kiosk - St.Luke's Hospital

References 

Companies based in Montreal